Imogene Lake is an alpine lake in Custer County, Idaho, United States, located in the Sawtooth Mountains in the Sawtooth National Recreation Area. The lake can be accessed from State Highway 75 in the Sawtooth Valley. There is a trailhead downstream of Hell Roaring Lake at the end of Sawtooth National Forest road 097, which is a high clearance road. There is another trailhead about two miles further downstream along forest road 210 for those who cannot drive road 097 as well as horses.

Hell Roaring Lake is in the Sawtooth Wilderness and wilderness permit can be obtained at trailheads. Several other small lakes surround Imogene Lake, while Hell Roaring Lake is downstream, Mushroom Lake is upstream, and Edith Lake over the ridge to the south of Imogene.

References

See also
 List of lakes of the Sawtooth Mountains (Idaho)
 Sawtooth National Forest
 Sawtooth National Recreation Area
 Sawtooth Range (Idaho)

Lakes of Idaho
Lakes of Custer County, Idaho
Glacial lakes of the United States
Glacial lakes of the Sawtooth Wilderness